is a Japanese actress from Kyoto, Kyoto Prefecture, working mostly in American productions.

Biography 
Kiki Sukezane was born to parents both of samurai descent; some ancestors were involved in the 1860 Sakuradamon Incident on the side of the rōnin, and others were ochimusha under the Taira clan. Her paternal uncle, Tomoki Sukezane, is a noted stylist and fashion magazine editor.

She played Miko Otomo in the 2015–2016 TV miniseries Heroes Reborn.

Sukezane spent a year in the United States as a foreign exchange student in South Dakota and learned English.  Sukezane attended acting school in Tokyo for two years before moving to Los Angeles, California.

Personal life
In June 2020, Sukezane revealed during Pride Month she was in a relationship with a woman.

Filmography

Film

Television

References

External links 
 
 

1989 births
Actresses from Kyoto Prefecture
Japanese lesbian actresses
Living people
Japanese expatriates in the United States